Psilocorsis purpurascens is a moth in the family Depressariidae. It was described by Walsingham in 1912. It is found in Guatemala.

The wingspan is about 18 mm. The forewings are purplish grey with a narrow pale cinereous line along the extreme edge of the costa, which is continued along the base of the terminal cilia. Underlying the purplish grey colour of the wing is a faint indication of transverse, striate, pale cinereous mottling. The hindwings are dull brownish cinereous.

References

Moths described in 1912
Psilocorsis